Thomas Blair (24 February 1892 – 28 August 1961) was a Scottish footballer who played as a goalkeeper.

Career
Blair was prominent in the 1910s playing for Kilmarnock, with the culimation of his nine-year spell there being a Scottish Cup win in 1920, lifting the trophy as team captain. He then moved to England with Manchester City, spending two years there but only the regular in his position in the second campaign. He played on both sides in the Home Scots v Anglo-Scots international trial and conceded only once in each match, but this did not lead on to a full cap for Scotland.

By now in his 30s, Blair accepted an invitation to play in the American Soccer League, appearing for teams including Fall River Marksmen and New Bedford Whalers. After several years in the United States he returned to Scotland with Ayr United (no league appearances recorded) then spent time in Northern Ireland at Linfield before becoming a coach at Dundee United in 1937. That same year he made a final, emergency SFL appearance in a 7–1 defeat to St Bernard's, aged 45.

References

1892 births
1961 deaths
Scottish footballers
People from Gorbals
Footballers from Glasgow
Kilmarnock F.C. players
Vale of Clyde F.C. players
Manchester City F.C. players
Dundee United F.C. players
Linfield F.C. players
Dundee United F.C. non-playing staff
American Soccer League (1921–1933) players
Association football goalkeepers
Scottish Junior Football Association players
Scottish Football League players
Scottish Football League representative players
English Football League players
Fall River Marksmen players
Boston Soccer Club players
Hartford Americans players
Pawtucket Rangers players
New Bedford Whalers players
NIFL Premiership players
Scottish expatriate sportspeople in the United States
Expatriate soccer players in the United States
Scottish expatriate footballers
Association football coaches